The 2010 Tour of the Basque Country, was the 50th edition of the Tour of the Basque Country cycling stage race. It started on 5 April and ended on 10 April. Chris Horner won the race 7 seconds ahead of Alejandro Valverde after winning the sixth and final stage which was an individual time trial 8 seconds ahead of Valverde. Valverde's results were subsequently removed after a retroactive suspension was applied.

Pre-Race Favourites
Two time defending champion, Alberto Contador announced that he would not be taking part in the 2010 Tour. Instead he put his focus at the Critérium International.
2009 Tour de France runner up Andy Schleck and his brother, Fränk Schleck as well as 2009 Vuelta a España champion Alejandro Valverde were heavy favourites. However other favourites also included 's Andreas Klöden, Italy's Damiano Cunego and Samuel Sánchez from Spain.

Teams
There are 20 teams competing in the 2010 Tour of the Basque Country. They are:

Stages

Stage 1
5 April 2010 – Zierbena to Zierbena, 

Alejandro Valverde was awarded the opening stage after Óscar Freire, who crossed the line first, was disqualified for interfering with him in the sprint. After the subsequent removal of Valverde's results, Freire was reinstated as stage winner.
Pre-race favourite, Samuel Sánchez missed a decisive split in the peloton and finished 1:38 behind the peloton, making a victory for him seem very unlikely.

Stage 2
6 April 2010 – Zierbena to Viana,

Stage 3
7 April 2010– Viana to Amurrio,

Stage 4
8 April 2010 – Murgia to Eibar, 

After missing a decisive split that put him over 1:30 behind the race leader, it was the Olympic Champion Samuel Sánchez who won the hilliest stage of this year's tour.

Samuel Sánchez caught Chris Horner at the top of the Alto de Usartza climb and then dived down the short descent to the finish to win by two seconds. Alejandro Valverde and Robert Gesink also caught Chris Horner who barely managed to stay with them.

The victory put Alejandro Valverde only one second ahead of Chris Horner and Robert Gesink respectively. The overall favourites knew they had to wait for the Alto de Usartza, that ended just two kilometres from the finish.

Samuel Sánchez's victory was 's first victory of the 2010 cycling year as well.

Stage 5
9 April 2010 – Eibar to Orio, 

Joaquim Rodríguez soloed across the finish line, taking 14 seconds off of race leader Alejandro Valverde and put him comfortably in 3rd place. 2008 Champion Samuel Sánchez came in 2nd place, just ahead of race leader Alejandro Valverde.

A large attack group including mountains classification leader Amets Txurruka spent much of the day ahead of the peloton. On the penultimate climb Txurruka attacked solo, but crashed on the descent towards the final climb. He was able to complete the stage, but broke his collarbone in the incident and had to drop out before the final time trial.

Robert Gesink who was in 3rd place after the previous stage, is now in 8th place after experiencing a crash on the final climb. His team (Rabobank) reported that he may have broken a bone in his hand.

Joaquim Rodríguez had attacked out of the chasing peloton with about 20 km to go, passing the remnants of an earlier escape group. He had come into the stage 48 seconds down on the general ranking, dangerous enough for Valverde, Horner and Sánchez to give chase.

Joaquim Rodríguez was happy with the result and the ITT is different than normal because it has a hilly finish. His dream is to take the GC.

Stage 6
10 April 2010 – Orio to Orio,  (Individual Time Trial)

Classification Leadership

Final Results

General classification

Points Classification

Mountains Classification

Sprints Classification

Team classification

See also 
 2010 in road cycling
 UCI Pro Tour

References

2010
2010 UCI ProTour
2010 in Spanish road cycling
Tour of the Basque Country